Wamba congener is a species of comb-footed spider in the family Theridiidae. It is found in USA, the Caribbean, and Central/South America.

References

Theridiidae
Spiders described in 1896
Spiders of North America
Spiders of South America